USS Corduba (AF-32) was an Adria class stores ship in service with the United States Navy from 1945 to 1955. She was scrapped in 1974.

History
Corduba was launched 11 June 1944 by Pennsylvania Shipyards, Inc, Beaumont, Texas, under a Maritime Commission contract; sponsored by Mrs. R. R. Clark; transferred to the Navy 30 December 1944; and commissioned 26 January 1945.

World War II 
Clearing Galveston, Texas, 13 February 1945 Corduba loaded cargo at Mobile, Alabama, sailed through the Panama Canal, and arrived at Pearl Harbor 19 March. The last day of the month she sailed for Eniwetok, arriving 11 April to report to Commander, Service Squadron 10. Corduba carried provisions from Auckland, New Zealand, to Tinian, Guam, Manus, Peleliu, and Saipan, from 12 April to her return to San Francisco, California, 15 October.

Cold War 
After reloading at San Francisco, California, Corduba put to sea 27 October 1945 for Okinawa and Tsingtao, China. From 26 November to 23 December she issued refrigerated provisions to ships serving in the reoccupation of China. Returning to San Pedro, California, 18 January 1946, Corduba carried cargo to the Philippines between 31 January and 18 April, and cleared San Francisco 20 May for the U.S. East Coast. She arrived at Charleston, South Carolina, 10 June.
 
Assigned to Service Force, Atlantic Fleet, Corduba carried provisions to Argentia, the Caribbean, northern Europe, and the Mediterranean.

Decommissioning and fate
She was placed in commission in reserve 20 August 1955 to begin her pre-inactivation overhaul at Charleston, South Carolina, and was placed out of commission in reserve there. She was transferred to the National Defense Reserve Fleet on 6 April 1960. Corduba was loaned to the U.S. Army and was reactivated 2 Jan 1962 at Ft. Eustis, Virginia (USA) by U.S. Army personnel of the 70th Transportation Detachment. Activation took two weeks at a cost of $6,500, saving the U.S. Army from chartering a similar vessel for 90 days at a cost of $27,000. Corduba was than used to train U.S. Army stevedores from 2 January 1962 to 10 January 1964 and 22 June 1966 to 1 October 1968. She was sold for scrap on 30 July 1974.

Military awards and honors 
Corduba's crew was eligible for the following medals:
 China Service Medal (extended)
 American Campaign Medal
 Asiatic-Pacific Campaign Medal
 World War II Victory Medal
 Navy Occupation Service Medal (with Asia clasp)
 National Defense Service Medal

References

External links 

 
shipscribe.com

Adria-class stores ships
World War II auxiliary ships of the United States
Ships built in Beaumont, Texas
1944 ships